The Spellman Museum of Stamps & Postal History, also commonly known as the Cardinal Spellman Philatelic Museum, is a not-for-profit organization dedicated to the appreciation of diversity through the medium of postage stamps and postal history.

Location 
The museum is located at 235 Wellesley Street, at Regis College, Weston, Massachusetts. The museum has limited hours and is open to the public on Thursdays through Sundays except in July and August when the museum is closed on Sundays. Special activities are held at the museum, and are listed in its schedule calendar.

History
The museum was founded in 1960, attended by a host of postal and philatelic dignitaries, and now contains over two million philatelic items, ranging from postage stamps, to postal history, to artifacts of communications through the mails. The collections that make up the museum are the personal collection of Cardinal Francis Spellman, the collections from the Philadelphia National Philatelic Museum, and collections and portions of collections donated or loaned by other collectors such as President Dwight D. Eisenhower, Musician Jascha Heifetz, and General Matthew Ridgway. Its principal mission is to engage and teach diversity, history, and geography through its philatelic exhibits, library, resource center, and programs for children.

The Spellman philosophy
Cardinal Spellman, around 1950, wrote:

Funding
The museum is supported by grants, donations, admission fees, an endowment fund, and other sources of donated funds.

Organization
The museum is administered by a Board of Trustees, a museum staff, a Director's Round Table of friends it can call upon for advice and support, and a number of dedicated volunteers.

Special services
For a nominal charge, the museum will evaluate philatelic collections, and extract archived collections for private viewing. It also allows space rental of its facilities.

See also
 Philately

External links
 

Philatelic museums in the United States
History museums in Massachusetts
Museums in Middlesex County, Massachusetts
Museums established in 1960
1960 establishments in Massachusetts
Regis College (Massachusetts)